Ernest Ralph Orsatti (September 8, 1902  – September 4, 1968) was a professional baseball player who was an outfielder and first base for the St. Louis Cardinals from  to . Orsatti appeared in four World Series, two of which the Cardinals won. Orsatti's brother Victor was a film producer and talent agent, and Orsatti joined his family's talent agency upon his retirement from baseball.

Early life
Orsatti  was born in Los Angeles, California. He was the son of Morris Orsatti and Mary Manse, both born in Italy. He had six siblings. He attended Manual Arts High School in Los Angeles.

Career
Orsatti batted and threw left-handed. He played for the 1925 Cedar Rapids Bunnies, with whom he batted .347 and hit 6 home runs. He played for the Syracuse team in the International League in 1926 before splitting the next season between the Houston Buffaloes of the Texas League and the St. Louis Cardinals. In 1928, he spent most of the season with the Minneapolis Millers of the American Association, and he hit .381 (sixth-highest in the league) over 123 games; he played 27 games for the Cardinals and appeared in his first World Series.

A Cardinals' regular after that point through 1935, Orsatti appeared in three more World Series (1930, 1931 and 1934). He played in 13 World Series games over those four seasons, hitting .273 in those series but only registering two RBIs, both in 1934. The Cardinals won two of those series (1931 and 1934).

After Orsatti had a mediocre season in 1935, the Cardinals were prepared to relegate him to their minor-league club in Rochester. In response, Orsatti wired from California that he was retiring from baseball. He made a brief return to the minor leagues in 1939 before retiring from baseball for good.

In 701 games played, Orsatti posted a .306 batting average (663-2165) with 306 runs scored, 10 home runs, 237 RBI, an on-base percentage of .360 and a slugging percentage of .416 in nine seasons. His career fielding percentage was .979.

Personal life
Orsatti married opera singer Inez Gorman and had three children. One of his brothers was talent agent and producer Victor Orsatti. He joined his brothers in the Orsatti Talent Agency after retiring from baseball. In 1946, the agency was said to be "third from the top where movie actors' agents get together." He also owned a floral and oddity shop with his brothers-in-law and received royalties on the sales of candy bars in Southern California movie theaters. 

Orsatti died in 1968 in Canoga Park, California four days shy of his 66th birthday.

References

External links

The Sprouting News Ernie Orsatti

1902 births
1968 deaths
Major League Baseball outfielders
Baseball players from Los Angeles
St. Louis Cardinals players
Burials at San Fernando Mission Cemetery